Natalio Rossi (born 22 February 1934) is an Argentine rower. He competed in the men's coxed pair event at the 1964 Summer Olympics.

References

1934 births
Living people
Argentine male rowers
Olympic rowers of Argentina
Rowers at the 1964 Summer Olympics
Place of birth missing (living people)
Pan American Games medalists in rowing
Pan American Games silver medalists for Argentina
Rowers at the 1963 Pan American Games